Kanawha Hotel is a historic hotel located at Elizabeth, Wirt County, West Virginia. It is a two-story, log core, clapboard covered building which gained its present appearance about 1870 with several frame additions.  The original section was built about 1800, and is possibly the oldest building in the county. The hotel operated from 1812 to 1928, after which it was sold as a private residence. Also on the property is a 19th-century well pavilion with a pyramidal roof.

It was listed on the National Register of Historic Places in 1986.

References

Hotel buildings on the National Register of Historic Places in West Virginia
Commercial buildings completed in 1800
Buildings and structures in Wirt County, West Virginia
National Register of Historic Places in Wirt County, West Virginia
Log buildings and structures on the National Register of Historic Places in West Virginia